"La Demanda" (English: "The Law Suite" / "The Demand") is a song by American singer Romeo Santos with Dominican singer Raulín Rodríguez. This is the second single for Santos' fourth studio album Utopía (2019). The music video was released on April 11, 2019. It was filmed in Dominican Republic. It was directed and produced by Joaquín Cambre. It's about two men who are in love with the same woman and they are sending her to court for being with them while not knowing of each other.

Charts

Weekly charts

Year-end charts

References 

2019 singles
2019 songs
Bachata songs
Romeo Santos songs
Spanish-language songs
Sony Music Latin singles
Songs written by Romeo Santos
Male vocal duets